PNS Munsif (M166) (formerly Sagittaire (M650)) is the lead ship of the  currently in service with the Pakistan Navy.

Construction, procurement, and deployment

French Navy service

Sagittaire was laid down in 1988, and launched on 9 November 1988 by its builder by French DCNS in Lorient Naval Yard in France. Her technology came from the Dutch Stork B.V. and Belgian ACEC, while DCNS designed the vessel.

In 1990–1991, she saw war operations during the military operation took place in the First Gulf War, and played a supporting role in the Gulf of Oman to clear the naval minefield.

Pakistan Navy service

In 1992, Pakistan entered in talks with France for acquiring the minehunters to improve its naval capability. The French Navy offered to sell Sagittaire which was immediately acquired through a quick payment transaction took place between the two countries in 1992.

Upon reporting to its homeport, the Karachi Naval Base, she was commissioned in the service of Pakistan Navy as Munsif on 26 October 1992 and went through the refitted modernization at the Karachi Naval Base according to the specifications required by the Pakistan military, including the installation and engineering of the flight deck to accommodate the Aérospatiale Alouette III.

In 1994, Pakistan entered in discussion with the France to design to build to commission the  based on the Tripartite class, with PNS Munsif becoming the lead ship of her class. Based on Munsif, her two sister ships were eventually built in a cooperation between the DCNS and the KSEW Ltd. in 1996 and 1997.

, PNS Munsif remained in active service for the Pakistan Navy.

References

Further reading
 Baker, A.D. The Naval Institute Guide to Combat Fleets of the World 1998–1999. Annapolis, Maryland, US: Naval Institute Press, 1998. .

External links
 

1988 ships
Éridan-class minehunters
Ships built in France
Munsif-class minehunters
Minehunters of Pakistan